Individual event for badminton at the 2017 Southeast Asian Games was held at the Axiata Arena, Kuala Lumpur from 26 to 29 August 2017.

Men's singles

Seeds

Finals

Top half

Bottom half

Women's singles

Seeds

Finals

Top half

Bottom half

Men's doubles

Seeds

Finals

Top half

Bottom half

Women's doubles

Seeds

Finals

Top half

Bottom half

Mixed doubles

Seeds

Finals

Top half

Bottom half

See also
Men's team tournament
Women's team tournament

References

External links
Tournament Link
Official website

Individual event